The Star Model Z-45 is a Spanish submachine gun manufactured by Star Bonifacio Echeverria, derived from the German MP 40.

Design 
The internal mechanisms are similar to the MP 40. Unlike the German version, the Z-45 is a selective fire weapon (full-auto or single shot). The gun was made in both folding stock and wood stock versions. The Z-45 had a fluted chamber to ease extraction with the powerful 9×23mm Largo cartridge. Most Z-45s were issued with a 30-round box magazine, but a short 10-round magazine was available for law enforcement, or for prison forces guarding prisoners.

Variants 
Versions chambered in 9×19mm Parabellum, .38 Super and .45 ACP were also produced, since the barrel can be easily removed.

Service
It was designed between 1942 and 1945. The Star Z-45 was adopted by the Guardia Civil in 1945, by the Spanish Police the next year, by the Air Force in 1947 and eventually by the Army in 1948. It was used in combat during the Ifni War against the Moroccan Army of Liberation.

Users

See also 
List of submachine guns
Celmi Modelo 1946

References

.38 Super submachine guns
9mm Largo firearms
9mm Parabellum submachine guns
.45 ACP submachine guns
MP 38 derivatives
Star firearms
Submachine guns of Spain